Vexillum boreocinctum is an extinct species of sea snail, a marine gastropod mollusk, in the family Costellariidae, the ribbed miters.

Distribution
Fossils of this marine species were found in Middle Miocene strata in Slovakia and Germany  (16.0 - 11.6 Ma)

References

 G. Wienrich. 1997. Die Fauna des marinen Miozäns von Kevelaer (Niederrhein). Band 1 Foraminiferen, Anthozoen. Backhuys Publishers, Leiden 1:1-187
 Biskupič R. (2020). A new evidence of Vexillum (Gastropoda: Costellariidae) from the middle Miocene (Serravallian) of the Vienna Basin (Slovakia). Acta Geologica Slovaca. 12(2): 75-88

External links
 

boreocinctum
Gastropods described in 1925